Chokri leads here. For Arabic-based name Chokri, see Shukri

Chokri, (also known as Chakrü, Chakhesang and Eastern Angami) is one of three languages spoken by the Chakhesang Naga of Phek district, Nagaland state, India. There are also some Chokri speakers residing in the Senapati District of Manipur. In 1991, it was estimated that there were 20,000 native Chokri speakers.

Phonology

 /b/ is heard as a fricative  when before /ɯ/.
 /p/ is heard as  when before /ɨ/.
 /m/ is heard as  when before high back vowels.
 /n/ is heard as [ŋ] between two high back vowels.

 Sounds /e, o/ can be heard as [, ] in free variation.

Script
The Chokri language is largely written in the Latin script.

References

Languages of Nagaland
Angami–Pochuri languages
Endangered languages of India